Zapoteco de la Sierra sur, noroeste is a name used by INALI for a variety of Zapotec recognized by the Mexican government.  It corresponds to three ISO languages:

Mixtepec Zapotec (ISO 639-3: zte), spoken in Villa Sola de Vega, Oaxaca
Zaniza Zapotec (ISO 639-3: zpw), spoken in western Oaxaca
Elotepec Zapotec (ISO 639-3: zpm), spoken in Oaxaca

See also
 Zapoteco